John McArdle (born 16 August 1949) is an English actor. He is most notable for playing Billy Corkhill in the soap opera Brookside, with many other smaller appearances in other soaps and dramas. Playing a regular character in Brooksides heyday (alongside Ricky Tomlinson and Sue Johnston, and working with writers such as Jimmy McGovern), he made himself memorable with his portrayal of a man beyond breaking point, which culminated with him ranting at neighbours and churning up their lawns as he drove his car around in circles.

McArdle was the subject of This Is Your Life in 2003 when he was surprised by Michael Aspel on the set of Merseybeat.

In 2006, McArdle portrayed Frank Taylor in an episode of BBC TV's Surviving Disaster that concerned the Munich air disaster of 1958, which Taylor was the only newspaper reporter to survive.

In 2010, McArdle played Christopher Mead's father in Waterloo Road.

He is also an accomplished stage actor, recently seen in Our Country's Good at the Liverpool Playhouse.

He is a patron of the Octagon Theatre in Bolton, and Chief Officer of Age UK Wigan.

From 2016 to 2017, he appeared in the ITV soap opera Emmerdale as regular character Ronnie Hale. Then in March 2023, he portrayed Phil Griffiths in an episode of the BBC soap opera Doctors.

Filmography

References

External links
 

1949 births
Living people
Male actors from Liverpool
English male soap opera actors